Christ Church is a grade II* listed church in Cricklade Street, Swindon, Wiltshire, England. It was built in 1851 to a design by George Gilbert Scott.

The church is one of two major buildings in Old Town, the other being the old town hall, only a few minutes walk away. Christ church is also a part of a parish, the other church to this parish is St Mary's, a small church near Commonweal School.

The interior of the building was remodeled in 2017 to provide better access, a gas heating system and LED lighting. The nave pews were retained and secured with an innovative fixing system allowing them to be removed on occasion to provide more space for large events.

The church grounds also house a modern Community Centre which hosts a wide variety of events and activities.

References

External links

http://www.christchurchswindon.co.uk/

Grade II* listed churches in Wiltshire
George Gilbert Scott buildings
Buildings and structures completed in 1851
Churches in Swindon